Tommaso della Testa Piccolomini (died 1482) was a Roman Catholic prelate who served as Bishop of Pienza (1470–1482) and Bishop of Montalcino (1470–1482).

Biography
On 26 October 1470, Tommaso della Testa Piccolomini was appointed Bishop of Pienza and Bishop of Montalcino by Pope Paul II.
He served concurrently (aeque personaliter) as Bishop of Pienza and Bishop of Montalcino until his death in 1482.

References

External links and additional sources
 (for Chronology of Bishops) 
 (for Chronology of Bishops) 
 (for Chronology of Bishops) 
 (for Chronology of Bishops) 

15th-century Italian Roman Catholic bishops
Bishops appointed by Pope Paul II
Year of birth missing
1482 deaths